Corner Canyon High School is a public school in Draper, Utah. It is the newest high school in the Canyons School District. Its colors are navy, silver and white, and its mascot is the Chargers.

History 
Corner Canyon High School opened in 2013. It was built at 12943 S. 700 East in Draper, Utah, using funds from a $250 million bond approved by voters in 2010. Its classroom wings are two stories tall, and it includes a lecture hall, an auditorium, a 3,300 seat gymnasium, and a football field with artificial turf. It was the first comprehensive high school in Draper, and the first new high school built by Canyons School District after it split from the Jordan District in 2009. It serves the community of Draper in the southeast corner of Salt Lake County. 

In 2022, Corner Canyon received the highest ranking of all traditional high schools in the state of Utah. According to the U.S. News’ rankings, Corner Canyon was ranked seventh best, with the top six spots in the state going to public charter schools. Rankings were based on College Readiness, AP Class Offerings among other criteria.

Speech & Debate team
The Corner Canyon Speech and debate team has become one of the most accomplished and fastest growing Speech and Debate teams in Utah. In just 3 years the head coach--Jeremy Acker--has taken the speech and debate team from 6 kids to nearly 50. The Corner Canyon Speech and Debate team has what is widely recognized as the best coaching staff in all of high school Speech and Debate, Jeremy Acker, Taylor Ouimette, and Lorelei Lassen. The Corner Canyon speech and debate team placed at 6A state for the first time ever in 2022, placing 3rd. In 2023 they placed 3rd by only 8 points, a difference so small that one of the policy teams winning the round where they lost on the cap k that the other team kicked would have provided enough points to win state (said person is not salty at all and is very happy about their season). They did however win Patriot Powerhouse and their own tournament--Charger Challenge--by wide margins this year. Corner Canyon Speech and Debate has also had multiple national qualifiers, including but not limited to Ronan Spencer, Kaiya Sharp, Catherine Fauccette, Aiden Messarian partnered with Ethan Fauccette, Abigail Holland partnered with August Brown. The Speech and Debate team is widely recognized pas way cooler than the theater department, who--according to Alyssa Miller--are not as fun.

Notable Alumni 
Zach Wilson - Professional Football Quarterback for the New York Jets

Jaxson Dart - Football Quarterback at the University of Mississippi

References

External links

School Website
canyonsdistrict.org
Tabroom.com

Public high schools in Utah
Educational institutions established in 2013
Schools in Salt Lake County, Utah
2013 establishments in Utah
Buildings and structures in Draper, Utah